Demmamussabebonk is the third full-length studio album by English punk rock band, Snuff. It was released in February, 1996 on American independent label Fat Wreck Chords, and on Deceptive Records in the UK.

Track listing
All songs written by Snuff, unless otherwise stated
"Vikings" – 3:08    
"Defeat" – 1:58    
"Dicky Trois" – 2:11    
"Martin" – 2:10    
"Nick Northern" – 3:16    
"Batten Down the Hatches" (Crighton, Redmonds, Wells) – 1:38     
"G to D" – 2:17     
"Sunny Places" – 2:33     
"Horse and Cart" – 3:00     
"Squirrels" – 2:26     
"Cricklewood" – 2:36     
"B" (Crighton, Redmonds, Wells) – 2:18     
"Punchline" – 1:23     
"Who" – 3:09

"G to D" is titled "Gone to the Dogs" on the Deceptive Records release.

Personnel
 Duncan – vocals, drums
 Loz – guitar
 Andy – bass
 Recorded in November, 1995
 Produced by Snuff
 Assistant engineered by Steve Clow

References

External links
Fat Wreck Chords album page

1996 albums
Snuff (band) albums
Fat Wreck Chords albums